Momoe (written: 百恵 or 百重) is a feminine Japanese given name. Notable people with the name include:

 (born 1980), Japanese professional wrestler
 (born 1959), Japanese singer, actress and idol

See also
, a character in the anime series Puella Magi Madoka Magica

Japanese feminine given names